Chomedokl is an island of Palau. It is most known for its north cave entrance, which is a World Heritage Site listed by UNESCO.

References

Uninhabited islands of Palau